The Manifesto of the South Russian People's Council (in Russian: Манифест Южнорусского народного Собора; in Ukrainian: Маніфест Південноруського народного Собору) is a document that proclaimed the creation of the state of Southern Rus on territory of Ukraine "in response to the terror and totalitarian imposition of the ideology of Nazism and Bandera by the former State of Ukraine". This manifesto was written by several members of United Russia in April 2022 and leaked on 28 April 2022. The area which this manifesto considers and highlights is that of the area which the Russian Army currently (as of April 2022) operates and controls within the borders of Ukraine, for which the Kremlin is considering the possibility of transforming into Southern Rus. This is in direct correlation to, and is an impact of, the 2022 Russian invasion of Ukraine.

Text

References

Events affected by the 2022 Russian invasion of Ukraine
Political history of Ukraine
Manifestos